Maharaja Leishemba Sanajaoba is the current titular king of Manipur, India, and a politician belonging to the Bharatiya Janata Party from Manipur. In 2020, he was elected as the member of Rajya Sabha from Manipur.

Debates on bills 
Leishemba Sanajaoba proposed 10 bills in the Rajya Sabha till 25 July 2022. The following are the bills proposed by Sanajaoba:

References 

1972 births
Bharatiya Janata Party politicians from Manipur
Language activists
Living people
Meitei royalty
Rajya Sabha members from Manipur
Religious leaders
Activists